Calochortus venustulus is a Mexican species of plants in the lily family native to central and eastern Mexico and bearing yellow flowers. Two varieties are recognized.

 Calochortus venustulus var. imbricus Reveal & W.J.Hess - Durango
 Calochortus venustulus var. venustulus - Chihuahua, Durango, Jalisco, México State

The epithet venustulus is a Latin word meaning "charming" or "elegant," derived ultimately from the name of the goddess Venus, Goddess of Love.

The varietal epithet imbricus means "rainy," chosen because it was raining the day the authors collected the original specimens.

References

External links
Pacific Bulb Society, Calochortus Species Eight photos of several species including Calochortus venustulus
Flowershots, Wildflowers of Mexico III photos of several species including Calochortus venustulus

venustus
Endemic flora of Mexico
Plants described in 1888